Lipodystrophy syndromes are a group of genetic or acquired disorders in which the body is unable to produce and maintain healthy fat tissue. The medical condition is characterized by abnormal or degenerative conditions of the body's adipose tissue. A more specific term, lipoatrophy ("lipo" is Greek for "fat", and "dystrophy" is Greek for "abnormal or degenerative condition"), is used when describing the loss of fat from one area (usually the face). This condition is also characterized by a lack of circulating leptin which may lead to osteosclerosis. The absence of fat tissue is associated with insulin resistance, hypertriglyceridemia, non-alcoholic fatty liver disease (NAFLD) and metabolic syndrome.

Types 
Lipodystrophy can be divided into the following types:
Congenital lipodystrophy syndromes
Congenital generalized lipodystrophy (Berardinelli-Seip syndrome)
Familial partial lipodystrophy
Marfanoid–progeroid–lipodystrophy syndrome
Chronic atypical neutrophilic dermatosis with lipodystrophy and elevated temperature syndrome
Acquired lipodystrophy syndromes
Acquired partial lipodystrophy (Barraquer-Simons syndrome)
Acquired generalized lipodystrophy
Centrifugal abdominal lipodystrophy (Lipodystrophia centrifugalis abdominalis infantilis)
Lipoatrophia annularis (Ferreira-Marques lipoatrophia)
Localized lipodystrophy
HIV-associated lipodystrophy

Epidemiology 
Congenital lipodystrophy (due to inherited genetic defect) is estimated to be extremely rare, possibly affecting only one per million persons. Acquired lipodystrophy is much more common, especially affecting persons with HIV infection.

Pathogenesis 
Due to an insufficient capacity of subcutaneous adipose tissue to store fat, fat is deposited in non-adipose tissue (lipotoxicity), leading to insulin resistance. Patients display hypertriglyceridemia, severe fatty liver disease and little or no adipose tissue. Average patient lifespan is approximately 30 years before death, with liver failure being the usual cause of death. In contrast to the high levels seen in non-alcoholic fatty liver disease associated with obesity, leptin levels are very low in lipodystropy.

Insulin injections 

A lipodystrophy can be a lump or small dent in the skin that forms when a person performs injections repeatedly in the same spot. These types of lipodystrophies are harmless and can be avoided by changing (rotating) the locations of injections. For those with diabetes, using purified insulins may also help.

One of the side-effects of lipodystrophy is the rejection of the injected medication, the slowing down of the absorption of the medication, or trauma that can cause bleeding that, in turn, will reject the medication.  In any of these scenarios, the dosage of the medication, such as insulin for diabetics, becomes impossible to gauge correctly and the treatment of the disease for which the medication is administered is impaired, thereby allowing the medical condition to worsen.

In some cases, rotation of the injection sites may not be enough to prevent lipodystrophy.

Antiretroviral drugs 

Lipodystrophy can be a possible side effect of antiretroviral drugs.  Other lipodystrophies manifest as lipid redistribution, with excess, or lack of, fat in various regions of the body.  These include, but are not limited to, having sunken cheeks and/or "humps" on the back or back of the neck (also referred to as buffalo hump) which also exhibits due to excess cortisol. Lipoatrophy is most commonly seen in patients treated with thymidine analogue nucleoside reverse transcriptase inhibitors  like zidovudine (AZT) and stavudine (d4T).

Diagnosis 
The diagnosis is a clinical diagnosis, established by an experienced endocrinologist. A genetic confirmation may be possible depending on the subtype. In up to ~40% of partial lipodystrophy patients, a causative gene has not been identified. Using a skinfold caliper to measure skinfold thickness in various parts of the body may or a total body composition scan using Dual-energy X-ray Absorptiometry may help identify the subtype. Dual-energy X-ray Absorptiometry may be useful by providing both regional %fat measurements, and direct visualization of fat distribution by means of a "fat shadow".

Treatment
Leptin replacement therapy with human recombinant leptin metreleptin has been shown to be an effective therapy to alleviate the metabolic complications associated with lipodystrophy, and has been approved by the FDA for the treatment of generalized lipodystrophy syndromes. In Europe based on EMA,  metreleptin should be used in addition to diet to treat lipodystrophy, where patients have loss of fatty tissue under the skin and build-up of fat elsewhere in the body such as in the liver and muscles. The medicine is used in: adults and children above the age of two years with generalised lipodystrophy (Berardinelli-Seip syndrome and Lawrence syndrome) and in adults and children above the age of 12 years with partial lipodystrophy (including Barraquer-Simons syndrome), when standard treatments have failed.

Volanesorsen is an Apo-CIII inhibitor that is currently being investigated as a potential therapeutic to reduce hypertriglycerides in Familial Partial Lipodystrophy patients in the BROADEN study.

Society and culture 
Lipodystrophy United is an American organization founded and run by lipodystrophy patients to support each other and raise awareness about lipodystrophy syndromes.

Lipodystrophy UK is a dedicated UK charity set up to support people affected by Lipodystrophy.

March 31 is observed as the World Lipodystrophy Day.

See also 
Keppen–Lubinsky syndrome
Lipoedema

References

External links 

Conditions of the subcutaneous fat